10 Years of Cheap Fame is a compilation album by Australian punk band 28 Days. It was released in March 2007. The album includes tracks from all four studio albums and three extended plays. The album was supported with a farewell tour.

Track listing

Release history

References

2007 greatest hits albums
Compilation albums by Australian artists
28 Days (band) albums